List of town halls in Paris

Town halls in Paris

References 
  Mairies d'arrondissement - Official Paris website
  Les 20 mairies d'arrondissement de Paris - Paris tourist office

 
Town halls in Paris
Paris